Paper Reclaim Ltd v Aotearoa International Ltd [2006] NZCA 27 (14 March 2006); [2006] 3 NZLR 188; (2006) 8 NZBLC 101,685; (2006) 11 TCLR 544 is a cited case in New Zealand holding that exemplary damages are not available for breaches of contract.

References

New Zealand contract case law